The 2010 West Asian Football Federation Women's Championship tournament was held from 20–28 February 2010 in  Abu Dhabi, United Arab Emirates.  The hosts won after defeating the defending champions, Jordan.

The tournament was won by the United Arab Emirates.

Participating teams
 
 
  (Malavan F.C.)
 
  (host nation)

Group stage

Group A

Group B

Knockout stage

Semi-finals

Third-place match

Final match

References

External links
RSSSF tournament results

2010
WAFF
2009–10 in Emirati football
2010
WAFF